George Cadle Price  (15 January 191919 September 2011) was a Belizean statesman who served twice as the head of government of Belize from 1961–1984 and 1989–1993. He served as First Minister and Premier under British rule until independence in 1981 and was the nation's first prime minister after independence that year. He is considered to have been one of the principal architects of Belizean independence. Today he is referred to by many as the "Father of the Nation". Price effectively dominated Belizean politics from the early 1960s until his 1996 retirement from party leadership, serving as the nation's head of government under various titles for most of that period.

He entered politics in 1947 with his election to the Belize City Council. In 1949, with the devaluation of the British Honduran dollar he, together with a group of citizens, formed the People's Committee. It was the start of the "peaceful, constructive Belizean revolution". On 29 September 1950, he co-founded the People's United Party, which he led for four decades and which was devoted to the political and economic independence of the British colony, then known as British Honduras.

Early life and education
George Price was born in Belize City in what was then British Honduras, to William and Irene (née Escalante) Price. He had eight sisters and two brothers.

Price received his early education at Holy Redeemer Primary School and St. John's College High School (SJC). He survived the hurricane of 1931 which destroyed SJC at Loyola Park, swimming away from the wreckage. Under the Jesuits he was exposed to the teachings of Catholic social justice, in particular the encyclical Rerum novarum. Upon graduation, the young Price felt a call to the priesthood, so he went to study abroad, first attending the Saint Augustine's Minor Seminary in Mississippi, United States, and later the Mayor Seminario Conciliar in Guatemala City. Throughout his life Price remained a devout Roman Catholic and attended Mass daily.

The war in Europe prevented him from completing his studies in Rome and, instead, George Price returned to Belize. He was hired by local businessman Robert Sidney Turton as his private secretary. Price also contributed to the Belize Billboard, then run by Philip Goldson.

Political career
 

After receiving encouragement from Turton, Price ran for election to the Belize City Council in 1944 and 1947, being successful in 1947. Upon the formation of the People's Committee (PC) in 1950, Price was named its Assistant Secretary, and in a famous speech later that year claimed that "National Unity" propelled the PC's actions. With the formation of the PUP, Price's stature rose and he ascended through the party ranks until he became Party Leader following a leadership dispute in 1956.

Elected to the colony's newly created Legislative Assembly in 1954, he also served as mayor of Belize City from 1956 to 1962. In 1956, Price became party leader of the PUP. As First Minister, a post he held since 1961, he led the team which began negotiations over independence with the United Kingdom. He maintained that post as Premier in 1964.

In 1981 Belize gained its independence, and Price served as the country's first prime minister and foreign minister until 1984. The PUP was defeated in the elections by the United Democratic Party under Manuel Esquivel, with Price unexpectedly losing his own House of Representatives seat to a political newcomer. Price continued to lead the PUP from outside the National Assembly while Florencio Marin became Leader of the Opposition. Price resumed the post of prime minister after successfully returning to the House in the 1989 election, serving until 1993, when he was again succeeded by Esquivel. In October 1996 he announced his resignation as party leader, and on 10 November 1996 was formally succeeded by Said Musa. Price remained a member of the Belize House until the 2003 election.

Honours
In September 2000, Price became the first person to receive Belize's highest honour, the Order of National Hero, for the prominent role he played in leading his country to independence. He has received similar honours in other Caribbean and Central American countries. In 1982, he was made a member of the Privy Council of the United Kingdom.

Death
Price died on 19 September 2011, at the age of 92. Almost 30 years earlier he united the people of Belize in the struggle for independence. Now, for one last time Price united all people of Belize, this time in mourning the death of their "Father of the Nation". On 26 September 2011, a state funeral was held. Price was laid to rest at the Lord's Ridge Cemetery in Belize City.

See also
List of prime ministers of Belize
Ministry of Finance (Belize)

References

External links
Free articles and images of George Price

1919 births
2011 deaths
People from Belize City
Belizean Roman Catholics
People's United Party politicians
Prime Ministers of Belize
Finance ministers of Belize
Foreign ministers of Belize
Members of the Belize House of Representatives for Freetown
Members of the Belize House of Representatives for Pickstock
Members of the Privy Council of the United Kingdom
Mayors of Belize City
20th-century Belizean people
21st-century Roman Catholics
20th-century Roman Catholics
Belizean independence activists
Belizean National Heroes
Burials in Belize
Recipients of the Order of the Caribbean Community